Rogério de Faria (Goa, 14 October 1770 — Bombay, 15 March 1848) was a Luso-Goan businessman.

Biography 
Rogério de Faria was a native of Chorão Island, son of Joao de Faria and Ana Maria D'Albuquerque e de Faria. The family migrated to Bombay after epidemics in Chorão Island in 1775. A Catholic Goan in the world of business, he was a pioneer in the opium trade in China, long before the British thought of entering this branch of commerce.

Consul of Brazil in Bombay 

Rogério de Faria was referred to in Bombay as a prince merchant. A resident of Bombay, where he was Consul of Brazil, Roger Faria did business in Bengal, Bombay and Macau. He was a big supporter of mayor Bernardo Peres da Silva, who had been appointed governor of Goa by the liberal government of Dom Pedro IV of Portugal, but rejected by the military stationed in Goa.

Biographies
According to  de Souza, he accessed part of Faria's business correspondence dating back to 1789-1830, involving dealings with the Mhamai Kamat Agency House in Goa. De Souza  suggests that the pre-1818 papers offer "much interesting information" that could help correct and supplement "whatever we know about Rogerio de Faria from a few contemporary published sources and from a few late and sketchy biographies."

Abbé Cottineau's Journal describes Sir Rogerio Faria's house as "commanding a most lovely view of the sea, the ramparts, the suburbs, the city, the Colaba island, and the West coast as far as the so-called Malabar Point. cited by Souza ).

De Souza says that Faria made his fortune in "opium-peddling", and writes: "We are not able to fully collaborate the statement, but we are told by the otherwise critical Indo-Portuguese administrator-historian, J.H. da Cunha-Rivara, that Sir Jamsetjee Jeejeebhoy, the most glamorous Parsee figures of the mid-nineteenth century in the annals of Bombay, started his prosperous career as a simple clerk in the firm of Rogerio de Faria. Reporting the death of Sir Roger's daughter, Miss Margaret de Faria, the  Bombay Gazette of 7 October 1889 added that Sir Jamsetjee had made his first voyage to China in a ship belonging to Sir Roger de Faria."

Faria had the financial losses. His only son died of tetanus after an accidental fall, a couple of years before him in 1848. The Goan journalist-editor A.M. da Cunha wrote a 30-page booklet  which Souza says "gives more details about the numerous progeny of Sir Roger than about him."

He lived out the rest of his life on a pension granted to him by his friend Sir Jamsetjee Jejeebhoy.

Memorial in Byculla

Naresh Fernandes writes in Bombaywallah.org: "Gloria Church [in Byculla, Bombay, now known as Mumbai, contains a memorial stone to an almost-forgotten Bombay character: the Goan opium trader Sir Roger de Faria."

See also

 de Souza, Teotonio R, For Goa and Opium. Goa: Penguin Books, 2006.
 de Souza, Teotonio R. "French slave-trading in Portuguese Goa (1773–1791)." Essays in Goan History (1989): 119-3.
 Trade and Finance in Portuguese India: A Study of the Portuguese Country Trade 1770-1840 by Celsa Pinto, Concept Publishing Company (1994) 
 Markovits, Claude. "The political economy of opium smuggling in early nineteenth century India: Leakage or Resistance?." Modern Asian Studies 43.01 (2009): 89-111.
 Siddiqi, Asiya. "Pathways of the Poppy." India and China in the Colonial World (2005): 21.

References

1770 births
1848 deaths
People of Chorão (Island)
Portuguese diplomats
Brazilian diplomats
Portuguese people of Goan descent
18th-century Portuguese businesspeople
19th-century Portuguese businesspeople
Opium in India
Opium in China
18th-century Indian businesspeople